Choi Eun-kyung (Hangul: 최은경, Hanja: 崔恩景, born December 26, 1984) is a South Korean short track speed skater. She is a double Olympic Champion in relays and a two-time Overall World Champion for 2003 and 2004.

Biography
At the 2002 Winter Olympics, Choi won a silver medal in the 1500 m and was a member of gold medal-winning relay team in 3000 m relay. She was the World record holder for 1500 m at the time.

Choi's career heights came between 2002 and 2006 Winter Olympics. She was the Overall World Champion in 2003 and in 2004. She also won the Overall World Cup title for 2003–2004 season.

At the 2006 Winter Olympics she equalled her achievements from the previous Olympics, winning a silver medal in the 1500 m and won gold in the 3000 m relay. She was disqualified in the finals of the 1000 m.

See also
 South Korea women's national short track team

External links
 Database Olympics

1984 births
Living people
South Korean female short track speed skaters
Olympic short track speed skaters of South Korea
Olympic gold medalists for South Korea
Olympic silver medalists for South Korea
Olympic medalists in short track speed skating
Short track speed skaters at the 2002 Winter Olympics
Short track speed skaters at the 2006 Winter Olympics
Medalists at the 2002 Winter Olympics
Medalists at the 2006 Winter Olympics
Asian Games medalists in short track speed skating
Short track speed skaters at the 2003 Asian Winter Games
Korea National Sport University alumni
Sportspeople from Daegu
Medalists at the 2003 Asian Winter Games
Asian Games gold medalists for South Korea
Asian Games silver medalists for South Korea
Universiade medalists in short track speed skating
World Short Track Speed Skating Championships medalists
Universiade gold medalists for South Korea
Competitors at the 2005 Winter Universiade
20th-century South Korean women
21st-century South Korean women